Thomas Leslie Teevan (July 1927 – 11 October 1954) was an Ulster Unionist Party politician and lawyer, notable for his extreme youth when first elected, brief career, and very early death.

Early life
Thomas Teevan was born in Limavady, County Londonderry, Northern Ireland, in 1927. He was educated at Limavady Academy and Queen's University Belfast. He was a lecturer in law.

Brief political career
In 1950, a vacancy arose in the Belfast West constituency, owing to the disqualification of the Reverend J. G. MacManaway for being an Anglican priest despite the Church of Ireland being disestablished. Teevan was selected as Unionist candidate for the ensuing by-election.

He was elected on 29 November 1950 over the Northern Ireland Labour Party candidate, Jack Beattie, a former MP for the seat, by 913 votes. Teevan was aged only 23 and became Baby of the House upon taking the oath on 5 December 1950.

His tenure lasted only 330 days, and he lost the seat to Beattie by just 25 votes in the 1951 general election. Aged only 24, he thus became the youngest person to leave the House of Commons in modern times. MacManaway himself died in November 1951, aged 53.

Career
Teevan qualified as a barrister in Northern Ireland in 1952. He also served as Chairman of Limavady Urban District Council and as Vice-President of the North Derry Unionist Association.

Death
Teevan died suddenly in 1954, at his home in Portstewart, County Londonderry, aged just 27.

See also
List of United Kingdom MPs with the shortest service

Notes

References
 'Who's Who of British MPs: Volume IV, 1945-1979' by Michael Stenton and Stephen Lees (Harvester, Brighton, 1979)

External links 

1927 births
1954 deaths
Alumni of Queen's University Belfast
Barristers from Northern Ireland
Members of the Bar of Northern Ireland
Members of the Parliament of the United Kingdom for Belfast constituencies (since 1922)
People from Limavady
Ulster Unionist Party members of the House of Commons of the United Kingdom
UK MPs 1950–1951